Inverse vulcanization is a solvent-free copolymerization process that produces polymers containing chains of sulfur atoms. This process uses the wide availability of high purity sulfur, a byproduct from the crude oil and natural gas refining processes and produces chemically stable sulfur-rich materials.

Synthesis 
Like Thiokols and sulfur-vulcanization, inverse vulcanization uses the tendency of sulfur catenate.  The polymers produced by inverse vulcanization consist of long sulfur linear chains interspersed with organic linkers. Traditional sulfur vulcanization produces a cross-linked material with short sulfur bridges, down to one or two sulfur atoms. 

The polymerization process begins with heating of elemental sulfur above its melting point (115.21 °C), in order to favor the ring-opening polymerization process (ROP) of the S8 monomer, occurring at 159°C. As a result, the liquid sulfur is constituted by linear polysulfide chains with diradical ends, which can be easily bridged together with small dienes, such as 1,3-Diisopropylbenzene(DIB), 1,4-diphenylbutadiyne, limonene, divinylbenzene (DVB), dicyclopentadiene, styrene, 4-vinylpyridine, cycloalkene and ethylidene norbornene, or longer organic molecules as polybenzoxazines, squalene and triglyceride.
Chemically, the diene carbon-carbon double bond (C=C) of the substitutional group disappears, forming the carbon-sulfur single bond (C-S) which binds together the sulfur linear chains. 
The advantage of such a polymerization is the absence of a solvent (solvent-free): Sulphur acts as comonomer and solvent. This makes the process highly scalable at the industrial scale. As evidence, the kilogram-scale synthesis of the poly(S-r-DIB) has been already accomplished.

Products, characterization and properties

 

Vibrational spectroscopy was performed to investigate the chemical structure of the copolymers: the presence of the C-S bonds was detected through Infrared or Raman spectroscopies. The high amount of S-S bonds makes the copolymer highly IR-inactive in the near and mid-infrared spectrum. As a consequence, sulfur-rich materials made via inverse vulcanization are characterized by a high refractive index (n~1.8), whose value depends again upon the composition and crosslinking species.
As shown by the thermogravimetric analysis (TGA), the copolymer thermal stability increases with the amount of the added crosslinker; in any case, all the tested compositions degrade above 222 °C. 

Focusing on the mechanical features, the copolymer behavior, included, the glass-transition temperature, depends upon composition and crosslinking species. For given comonomers, the behavior of the copolymers as a function of the temperature depends on the chemical composition, for example, the poly (sulfur-random-divinylbenzene) behaves as a plastomer for a diene content between 15-25%wt, and as a viscous resin with the 30–35%wt of DVB. On the other hand, the poly (sulfur-random-1,3-diisopropenylbenzene) acts as thermoplastic at 15–25%wt of DIB, while it becomes a thermoplastic-thermosetting polymer for a diene concentration of 30-35%wt. 
The possibility to break and reform the chemical bonds along the polysulfides chains (S-S) allows to repair the copolymer by simply heating above 100 °C. This feature increases the reforming and recyclability of the high molecular weight copolymer.
The high amount of S-S bonds makes the copolymer highly IR-inactive in the near and mid-infrared spectrum. As a consequence, sulfur-rich materials made via inverse vulcanization are characterized by a high refractive index (n~1.8), whose value depends again upon the composition and crosslinking species.

Potential applications 
The sulfur-rich copolymers made via inverse vulcanization could in principle find diverse applications thanks to the simple synthesis process and their thermoplasticity.

Lithium-sulfur batteries 

This new way of sulfur processing has been exploited for the cathode preparation of long-cycling lithium-sulfur batteries. Such electrochemical systems are characterized by a greater energy density than commercial Li-ion batteries, but they are not stable for a long service life. Simmonds et al. first demonstrated an improved capacity retention for over 500 cycles with an inverse vulcanization copolymer, suppressing the typical capacity fading of sulfur-polymer composites. Indeed, the poly (sulfur-random-1,3-diisopropenylbenzene), briefly defined as poly (S-r-DIB), showed a higher composition homogeneity compared with other cathodic materials, together with a greater sulfur retention and an enhanced adjustment of the polysulfides' volume variations. These advantages made it possible to assemble a stable and durable Li-S cell. After that, other copolymers via inverse vulcanization were synthesized and tested inside these electrochemical devices, again providing exceptional stability over cycles.

In order to overcome the great disadvantage related to the materials' low electrical conductivity (1015–1016 Ω·cm), researchers started to add special carbon-based particles, to increase the electron transport inside the copolymer. Furthermore, such carbonaceous additives improve the polysulfides' retention at the cathode through the polysulfides-capturing effect, increasing the battery performances. Examples of employed nanostructures are long carbon nanotubes, graphene, and carbon onions.

Mercury capture 
The new materials could be used to remove toxic metals from soil or water. However, pure sulfur cannot be employed to manufacture a functional filter, because of its low mechanical properties. Therefore, inverse vulcanization was investigated to produce porous materials, in particular for the mercury capturing process. The liquid metal binds together with the sulfur-rich copolymer, remaining mostly inside the filter.

Infrared transmission 
Polymers are used for IR optical applications because of their low refractive index (n~1.5-1.6); their poor transparency towards infrared radiation limits their exploitation in this sector. On the other hand, inorganic materials (n~2-5) are characterized by high-cost and complex processability, detrimental factors for large-scale production.

Sulfur-rich copolymers, made via inverse vulcanization, represent an alternative due to the simple manufacturing process, low cost reagents, and high refractive index. As mentioned before, the latter depends upon the S-S bonds concentration, leading to the possibility of tuning the optical properties of the material by simply modifying the chemical formulation. Such a possibility of changing the material's refractive index to fulfill the specific application requirements, makes these copolymers applicable in the military, civil or medical fields.

Others 
The inverse vulcanization process can also be employed for the synthesis of activated carbon with narrow pore-size distributions. The sulfur-rich copolymer acts here as a template where the carbons are produced. The final material is doped with sulfur and exhibits a micro-porous network and high gas selectivity. Therefore, inverse vulcanization could also be applied in the gas separation sector.

See also 
 Sulfur
 Free-radical polymerization
 Lithium-sulfur batteries

References

External links
"New “inverse vulcanization” process produces polymeric sulfur that can function as high performance electrodes for Li-S batteries". 15 April 2013.

Chemical processes
Reaction mechanisms
Polymerization reactions